Poland participated in the Eurovision Song Contest 2004 with the song "Love Song" written by Tatiana Okupnik and Paweł Rurak-Sokal. The song was performed by the band Blue Café. The Polish broadcaster Telewizja Polska (TVP) organised the national final Krajowe Eliminacje do Konkursu Piosenki Eurowizji 2004 in order to select the Polish entry for the 2004 contest in Istanbul, Turkey. The national final took place on 24 January 2004 and featured fifteen entries. "Love Song" performed by Blue Café was selected as the winner after gaining 17.76% of the public vote.

As one of ten highest placed finishers in the 2003 contest Poland directly qualified to compete in the final of the Eurovision Song Contest which took place on 15 May 2004. Performing in position 19, Poland placed seventeenth out of the 24 participating countries with 27 points.

Background 
Prior to the 2004 Contest, Poland had participated in the Eurovision Song Contest eight times since its first entry in 1994. Poland's highest placement in the contest, to this point, has been second place, which the nation achieved with its debut entry in 1994 with the song "To nie ja!" performed by Edyta Górniak. Poland has only, thus far, reached the top ten on one other occasion, when Ich Troje performing the song "Keine Grenzen – Żadnych granic" finished seventh in 2003.

The Polish national broadcaster, Telewizja Polska (TVP), broadcasts the event within Poland and organises the selection process for the nation's entry. TVP confirmed Poland's participation in the 2004 Eurovision Song Contest on 6 September 2003. In 2003, TVP organised a televised national final for the first time that featured a competition among several artists and songs in order to select the Polish entry for the Eurovision Song Contest, a selection procedure that continued for their 2004 entry.

Before Eurovision

Krajowe Eliminacje do Konkursu Piosenki Eurowizji 2004 
Krajowe Eliminacje do Konkursu Piosenki Eurowizji 2004 was the national final organised by TVP in order to select the Polish entry for the Eurovision Song Contest 2004. The show took place on 24 January 2004 at the Studio 5 of TVP in Warsaw, hosted by Tomasz Kammel and Magdalena Mołek. Public televoting exclusively selected the winner. The show was broadcast on TVP1 and TVP Polonia as well as streamed online at the broadcaster's website tvp.pl. The national final was watched by 6.5 million viewers in Poland with a market share of 39.5%.

Competing entries 
TVP opened a submission period for interested artists and songwriters to submit their entries between 6 September 2003 and 5 November 2003. The broadcaster received 73 submissions at the closing of the deadline. A seven-member selection committee selected nine entries from the received submissions to compete in the national final. The selection committee consisted of Marek Sierocki (music journalist and artistic directors of the Opole Festival and Sopot Festival), Janusz Kosiński (journalist), Hirek Wrona (journalist), Zygmunt Kukla (conductor, composer), Piotr Metz (programme director of Radio Eska), Piotr Klatt (musician, songwriter, journalist and music producer at TVP) and Bartosz Jastrzębowski (director). The selected entries were announced on 6 November 2003.

Final 
The televised final took place on 24 January 2004. Fifteen entries competed and the winner, "Love Song" performed by Blue Café, was determined entirely by a public vote. In addition to the performances of the competing entries, singer In-Grid and 2003 Eurovision winner Sertab Erener performed as the interval acts.

At Eurovision
According to Eurovision rules, all nations with the exceptions of the host country, the "Big Four" (France, Germany, Spain and the United Kingdom) and the ten highest placed finishers in the 2003 contest are required to qualify from the semi-final in order to compete for the final; the top ten countries from the semi-final progress to the final. As Poland finished seventh in the 2003 contest, the nation automatically qualified to compete in the final on 15 May 2004. On 23 March 2004, a special allocation draw was held which determined the running order and Poland was set to perform in position 19 in the final, following the entry from Ireland and before the entry from United Kingdom. Poland placed seventeenth in the final, scoring 27 points.

Only the final was broadcast in Poland on TVP1 and TVP Polonia with commentary by Artur Orzech. The Polish spokesperson, who announced the Polish votes during the final, was Maciej Orłoś.

Voting 
Below is a breakdown of points awarded to Poland and awarded by Poland in the grand final of the contest. The nation awarded its 12 points to Ukraine in the final of the contest.

References

2004
Countries in the Eurovision Song Contest 2004
Eurovision
Eurovision